The Baudelaire Fractal is the debut novel by Canadian poet Lisa Robertson. Published in 2020, it shifts locations between London, Vancouver, Paris and the French countryside, dealing with a modern writer who has unexpectedly written the complete works of Charles Baudelaire.

The novel was shortlisted for the Governor General's Award for English-language fiction at the 2020 Governor General's Awards.

References

2020 Canadian novels
2020 debut novels
Novels set in London
Novels set in Vancouver
Novels set in Paris
Novels set in France
Works about Charles Baudelaire
Coach House Press books